Flinton is a village in the East Riding of Yorkshire, England, in an area known as Holderness.

Flinton forms part of the civil parish of Humbleton.

In 1823 the village was in the Wapentake of Holderness. Population at the time was 125.

References

External links

Villages in the East Riding of Yorkshire
Holderness